Udham Singh Nagar District is a district of Uttarakhand state in northern India. Rudrapur is the district headquarters. This district consists of nine Tehsils named Bajpur, Gadarpur, Rudrapur, Jaspur, Kashipur, Kichha, Khatima, Sitarganj, Nanakmatta. The district is located in the Terai region, and is part of Kumaon Division. It is bounded on the north by Nainital District, on the northeast by Champawat District, on the east by Nepal, and on the south and west by Bareilly, Rampur, Moradabad, Pilibhit and Bijnor District of Uttar Pradesh state. The district was created on 29 September 1995, by Mayawati government out of Nainital District. It is named for freedom fighter and Indian revolutionary Udham Singh.

As of 2011, it is the third most populous district of Uttarakhand (out of 13), after Haridwar and Dehradun.

Tehsils in Udham Singh Nagar district
 Kashipur
 Jaspur
 Bajpur
 Gadarpur
 Rudrapur
 Kichha
 Sitarganj
 Nanakmatta
 Khatima

Cities in Udham Singh Nagar district
 Rudrapur
 Kashipur
 Jaspur
 Bajpur
 Gadarpur
 Dineshpur
 Pantnagar
 Kichha
 Sitarganj
 Nanakmatta
 Khatima
 Sultanpur, Uttarakhand

Administrative divisions
The district lies in Nainital–Udhamsingh Nagar (Lok Sabha constituency). which includes whole Nainital district as well as Udham Singh Nagar district. For election purposes Udham Singh Nagar district is divided into nine Vidhan Sabha constituencies:
 Bajpur Assembly constituency
 Kashipur Assembly constituency
 Rudrapur Assembly constituency
 Kichha Assembly constituency
 Sitarganj Assembly constituency
 Khatima Assembly constituency
 Gadarpur Assembly constituency
 Nanakmatta Assembly constituency
 Jaspur Assembly constituency

Demographics

According to the 2011 census Udham Singh Nagar district has a population of 1,648,902, roughly equal to the nation of Guinea-Bissau or the US state of Idaho. The population in the age range of 0–6 years was 229,162. The number of literates in Udham Singh Nagar district is 1,037,839 (62.9%), with 598,525 (68.7%) male literates and 751,789 (55.6%) female literates. The effective 7+ literacy of the district is 73.1%. The sex ratio of 920 females for every 1,000 males. The Scheduled Castes and Scheduled Tribes population was 238,264 (14.45%) and 123,037 (7.46%) respectively. There were 308581 households in the district in 2011.

Languages 

The major languages of the district according to the 2011 census are Hindi (%), Punjabi (%), Bengali (%), Urdu (%), Kumaoni (%), Bhojpuri (%), and Tharu (%). The two Tharu languages spoken are Buksa (mostly in the development blocks of Bajpur and Gadarpur), and Rana (in the areas of Khatima and Sitarganj).

Education
Govind Ballabh Pant University of Agriculture & Technology in Pantnagar, is located 5 km from Rudrapur.

References

External links
 

 
Districts of Uttarakhand
Minority Concentrated Districts in India